David or Dave Barnett may refer to:

Arts
David Barnett (writer) (born 1970), English journalist and author
David Barnett (composer) (1907–1985), American musician
David Barnett, Scottish musician and author, member of The Boyfriends and Luxembourg among others, author of a biography of Suede

Sport
Dave Barnett (born 1958), American basketball, football and baseball sportscaster
Dave Barnett (footballer) (born 1967), English soccer player

Other
David Henry Barnett (born 1933), CIA officer who was convicted of espionage for the Soviet Union in 1980
David C Barnett (born 1975), Canadian small business expert, author and speaker.